The Southern Conference Men's Basketball Player of the Year is a basketball award given to the Southern Conference's (SoCon) most outstanding player. The award was first given following the 1951–52 season. Fred Hetzel of Davidson is the only player to have won the award three times (1963–1965). Sixteen other players have won the award twice, most recently done by Isaiah Miller of UNC Greensboro (2020, 2021).

Davidson and Furman have the most all-time winners with 13, but Davidson left the SoCon after the 2013–14 season to join the Atlantic 10 Conference. There have also been nine ties in the award's history, but only one (1970–71 season) which occurred prior to the 1989–90 season. That season was the first for two separate player of the year awards—one by the Southern Conference men's basketball coaches, and the other by conference media members. When both the coaches and media select the same player, he is the consensus conference player of the year.

The only current members that have never had a winner are Samford and Mercer. Both are among the SoCon's newer members, having respectively joined in 2008 and 2014.

Key

Winners

Winners by school

Footnotes

References
 .

Awards established in 1952
NCAA Division I men's basketball conference players of the year
Player Of The Year